Eyes in the Back of Your Head is an album by the pianist Geri Allen, recorded in late 1995 and early 1996 and released on the Blue Note label.

Reception 

AllMusic stated: "The music is mostly avant-garde, but purposeful and logical in its own fashion. Well worth several listens". JazzTimes stated: "In conversation she's a thoroughly grounded woman, in music she brings that as well as a sense of storytelling and picture painting that never borders on the precious, and this recording is equal parts-pure Geri Allen, always rewarding".

Track listing 
All compositions by Geri Allen except as indicated
 "Mother Wit" - 3:05
 "New Eyes Opening" - 5:37
 "Vertical Flowing" (Geri Allen, Ornette Coleman) - 5:27
 "M.O.P.E." - 6:11
 "FMFMF (For My Family, for My Friends)" - 5:34
 "Dark Eyes" (Geri Allen, Wallace Roney) - 4:20	
 "Little Waltz" (Ron Carter) - 6:11
 "In the Back of Your Head" (Allen, Roney) - 5:52
 "Windows to the Soul" - 5:11	
 "The Eyes Have It" (Allen, Ornette Coleman) - 7:23

Personnel 
 Geri Allen - piano, synthesizer
 Wallace Roney - trumpet (tracks 4, 6, 8 & 9)
 Ornette Coleman - alto saxophone (tracks 3 & 10)
 Cyro Baptista - percussion (tracks 1, 4 & 6)

References 

1997 albums
Geri Allen albums
Blue Note Records albums
Albums produced by Teo Macero
Instrumental albums